Consejo Nacional de Ciencia y Tecnología (Spanish for National Council of Science and Technology; abbreviated CONACYT) is Mexico's entity in charge of the promotion of scientific and technological activities, setting government policies for these matters, and granting scholarships for postgraduate studies. It is the equivalent of the US's National Science Foundation and Argentina's CONICET. It is officially designated as a decentralized public agency of Mexico's federal government. CONACYT was founded in 1970.

Programs
CONACYT grants scholarships for graduate studies (masters and doctoral) in Mexico for programs that have been recognized by CONACYT in the Registry of Quality Graduate Programs (abbreviated PNPC in Spanish). CONACYT also grants scholarships for Mexican nationals to pursue graduate studies in foreign countries. CONACYT also provides funding for postdoctoral positions and sabbatical leaves.

CONACYT also administers the National System of Researchers (abbreviated as SNI, in Spanish), a national network promoting high quality scientific research. Membership to the system and the level assigned (candidate, I, II, III, emeritus) dependents on scientific productivity and is evaluated by peer committees. Members of SNI, both Mexican and foreign, receive a monthly stipend directly from CONACYT only if they work in institutions or universities located in Mexico. The specific amount of the monetary stipend increases depending on the membership level. Mexican nationals working full time on research-related activities but ascribed to institutions located outside Mexico are eligible for membership but not for the stipend. In these cases, the appointment is considered a distinction.

Research Centers
CONACYT also manages programs to encourage industry and private sector involvement in science and technology R&D, through the RENIECYT (National Registry of Institutions and Businesses in Science and Technology) to offer financing to technical and technological development projects.

CONACYT also manages 26 public research centers, CPI located in several parts of Mexico and dedicated usually to a narrow field of science. Some of the best known are:

 CIDE (Center for Research and Teaching in Economics)
 COLMEX (College of Mexico)
CIMAT (Center for Research in Mathematics)
INAOE (National Institute of Astrophysics, Optics and Electronics)
CICESE (Ensenada Center for Scientific Research and Higher Education)
 INFOTEC (Center for Research and Innovation in Information Technology and Communications)
CIDETEQ (Center for Innovation and Technological Development in Electrochemistry)
 CIO (Center for Research in Optics)
 CentroGeo (Center for Research in Geography and Geomatics)
COMIMSA (Mexican Coorportaion of Materials Research)

CONACYT's general directors 

The head of CONACYT is appointed directly by the President of Mexico. Since CONACYT was founded it has been led by:

 Eugenio Méndez Docurro M.Sc. in engineering (1971–1972)
 Gerardo Bueno Zirión, Ph.D. (1973–1976)
 Edmundo Flores Flores, Ph.D. (1977–1982)
 Héctor Mayagoitia Domínguez, Ph.D. (1983–1988)
 José Gerstl Valenzuela, Ph.D. (1988)
 Manuel V. Ortega Ortega, Ph.D. (1989–1990)
 Fausto Alzati, Ph.D. (1991–1994)
 Carlos Bazdresch Parada, Ph.D. (1995–2000)
 Jaime Parada Ávila, Ph.D. (2001–2005)
 Gustavo Chapela Castañares, Ph.D. (2005–2006)
 Juan Carlos Romero Hicks, M.A. (2007 to 2011)
 José Enrique Villa Rivera, Ph.D. (2011 to 2012)
 Enrique Cabrero Mendoza, Ph.D. (2012 to 2018)
 María Elena Álvarez-Buylla Roces, Ph.D. (2018 to present)

CONACYT's press agency
CONACYT has its own press agency to covert topics of science and technology in Mexico.

Controversies 

In 2006 the director of CONACYT named new general directors of two Public Research Centers (IPICYT and CIMAT). This was criticized, because it was seen as the director overstepping his authority and even violating the Constitution as it denied the autonomous nature granted to Mexican CPIs.

References

External links 
 CONACYT website
http://cienciamx.com/index.php
PNPC
 SNI
 RENIECYT
 CPI
 https://www.cio.mx/
https://www.cimat.mx/

Scientific research foundations
Research institutes in Mexico
Science and technology in Mexico
1970 establishments in Mexico